Halidasht (also Romanized as Halīdasht) is a village in Babol Kenar Rural District, Babol Kenar District, Babol County, Mazandaran Province, Iran. At the 2006 census, its population was 935, in 237 families.

References 

Populated places in Babol County